Stephen Longfellow (March 23, 1776 – August 2, 1849) was a U.S. Representative from Maine.

Biography
Born in Gorham in the Province of Massachusetts Bay (in what is now Maine) to Stephen Longfellow and Patience Young Longfellow, Longfellow attended Phillips Academy, Andover, MA, and then from Harvard University in 1798. He studied law and was admitted to the bar in 1801 and commenced practice in Portland, Maine. He married Zilpah Wadsworth in 1804 and, with her, had eight children, including the poets Henry Wadsworth Longfellow and Samuel Longfellow.

He served as a member of the general court of Massachusetts in 1814 and 1815. He belonged to the Federalist Party and was a delegate to the Hartford Convention in 1814 and 1815. He also served as a Federalist presidential elector in 1816.

Longfellow was elected as an Adams-Clay Federalist to the Eighteenth Congress (March 4, 1823 – March 3, 1825). He was not a candidate for renomination in 1824 and resumed his law practice for a time.

He served as a member of the state house of representatives in 1826. He served as overseer of Bowdoin College, Brunswick, Maine from 1811 to 1817 and was a trustee of the college from 1817 to 1836. He supported the Portland Athenaeum. One of its founding members, he also served as president of the Maine Historical Society in 1834.

Longfellow died in Portland, Maine on August 2, 1849 and was buried in the Western Cemetery.

References

1776 births
1849 deaths
Members of the Maine House of Representatives
Members of the United States House of Representatives from Maine
Massachusetts Federalists
Harvard University alumni
Politicians from Gorham, Maine
Politicians from Portland, Maine
Maine Federalists
Henry Wadsworth Longfellow
Federalist Party members of the United States House of Representatives
Burials at Western Cemetery (Portland, Maine)